Alberta Provincial Highway No. 44, commonly referred to as Highway 44, is a highway in northern Alberta, Canada that extends from Hondo to Highway 16 (Yellowhead Highway) east of Spruce Grove. It is the primary route between the Edmonton area and the Lesser Slave Lake region. The stretch between Highway 16 and Westlock was formerly Secondary Highway 794, but due to a large increase in traffic it was upgraded to Highway 44 in 1999.

Major intersections 
From south to north:

References 

044